The 1887 Princeton Tigers football team represented Princeton University in the 1887 college football season. The team finished with a 7–2 record.  The Tigers held their first nine opponents scoreless, winning those games by a combined 420 to 0 score. The team then lost the last two games of the season against Harvard and Yale.

Schedule

References

Princeton
Princeton Tigers football seasons
Princeton Tigers football